Equestrian competitions were contested by participating nations at the 1999 Pan American Games in Winnipeg, Manitoba, Canada.

Events

Medal table

See also
 Equestrian at the 2000 Summer Olympics

References 
  .
 

Events at the 1999 Pan American Games
1999
1999 in equestrian
Equestrian sports competitions in Canada